Lawley Pharmaceuticals is a privately owned Australian pharmaceutical company established by pharmacist Michael Buckley in 1995.

The company specializes in the manufacture of pharmaceutical-grade hormone replacement therapies and is focused on the development of testosterone and progesterone creams for the treatment of various endocrine deficiencies and medical conditions.
In Men these disorders include Hypogonadism, Klinefelter's syndrome, low libido and castration.
In Women these disorders include Endometriosis, Menopause, PCOS, Fibroids, Female Androgen deficiency, Infertility, Estrogen dominance, Menorrhagia and Hysterectomy.

Over the past 20 years, the company has grown to become a leader in the research and development of transdermal hormone preparations and is advancing clinical research using natural hormones.

History 
Lawley Pharmaceuticals was founded in 1996 as an offshoot from a retail company and is based in Perth, Western Australia.

Since its inception, the company has conducted extensive medical research, with the mission of establishing naturally occurring hormones (bio-identical hormone treatments) as cornerstone treatments for diseases such as breast cancer, infertility, sexual dysfunction, late-onset male hypogonadism, postpartum depression and endometriosis.

Today, Lawley's products have been subjected to clinical studies published in peer-reviewed journals including Menopause, Climacteric and The Journal of Steroid Biochemistry and Molecular Biology.

Key Executives 
Michael John Buckley is Australian citizen born on 20 May 1961. After attending the St. Kevins College in Melbourne, he went to the Victorian College of Pharmacy from where he received a Bachelor of Pharmacy in 1982. Buckley moved to Perth in 1983 to work as pharmacist in both hospital and retail pharmacy environments.

After an extensive career in the pharmaceutical retail sector, Michael came to the conclusion that bio-identical hormones (Hormones matching chemicals that the body produces) must be better than using synthetic alternatives to treat disorders. To prove this, he devoted his further career to the understanding of the role and effectiveness of bio-identical hormones. Once convinced that bio-identical hormones were superior over their synthetic alternatives, he started the company Lawley Pharmaceuticals in 1995 to manufacture pharmaceutical grade bio-identical hormone creams for use by pharmacies, doctors, and hospitals.

As the CEO and Medical Director of the company, Michael Buckley has directed research and development, clinical trial programs, the meeting of global regulatory requirements and marketing of Lawley’s transdermal hormone preparations.

To date he has developed the optimal delivery systems for the administration of naturally occurring hormones to counter endocrine deficiency states. This success reflects Buckley’s commitment to the use of bio-identical hormones, in preference to a synthetic hormone analogue, specifically the hormones testosterone, progesterone and estradiol.

Michael Buckley is a member of the Australasian Menopause Society, The Pharmaceutical Society of Australia, and The Pharmacy Guild of Australia.

Manufacturing 

Lawley are manufacturing partners with Perrigo Laboratories Pty Ltd., formerly called Orion Laboratories, in Balcatta, Western Australia. Perrigo is an Australian government approved facility, listed on the Australian Register of Therapeutic Goods. The facility was TGA approved in January 2004 and fully commissioned in August 2004.

Products 

Company products include AndroForte, AndroFeme and ProFeme, which are all TGA approved.

Medical Research and Clinical Trials 
Lawley's research and clinical trials take place in Australia and the United States, where the company is involved in the process of developing and testing new treatment options in therapeutic areas of men's and women's health. Specific areas of interest include andrology, gynaecology, urology and endocrinology.

Results of Completed Clinical Trials 
Between 2000 and 2004, research by Lawley mainly focused on the clinical efficacy of their creams AndroFeme and AndroForte.

Results of Lawley's other previous research demonstrated that topically applied progesterone is rapidly absorbed into the skin and transported through the body with a distribution pattern and metabolism comparable to those previously reported for intravascularly administered progesterone. In 2003, a study aiming at evaluating the efficacy of transdermal testosterone therapy found that such a treatment improves well-being, mood, and sexual function in pre-menopausal women with low libido and low testosterone. Another clinical trial published by Climacteric in 2007, further confirmed that Testosterone cream significantly improves sexual scores in menopausal women with low sexual desire.

One of the most recent studies revealed that for women after menopause a low dose of 5 mg testosterone cream suffices to raise testosterone back to a premenopausal level.

Current Involvement in Research 
The product AndroFeme, an androgen cream for women, is currently being studied in a collaborative study at Boston’s Massachusetts General Hospital conducted by Harvard Medical School Professor Karen K Miller, MD.
Other current studies are researching the effects of hormones on different conditions such as Alzheimer's disease, In vitro fertilisation (IVF), Depression, and Dry Eye in postmenopausal women.

References

External links 
Company Facebook Page
Product and information Site
Bio-identical Testosterone and Progesterone Creams

Privately held companies of Australia
Pharmaceutical companies of Australia
Pharmaceutical companies established in 1995